The 2017 Abu Dhabi Tour was a road cycling stage race that took place between 23 and 26 February. It was the third edition of the Abu Dhabi Tour and was the third event of the 2017 UCI World Tour. It was the first time that the race was included in the UCI World Tour calendar.

The race's mountain-top finish at Jebel Hafeet provided the final podium of the race, after Mark Cavendish, Marcel Kittel and Caleb Ewan won the three sprint stages. 2013 world champion Rui Costa, riding for the newly renamed , broke away with 's Ilnur Zakarin, with the two staying clear to the end; Costa was able to out-sprint Zakarin, and with the additional bonus seconds for winning the stage, Costa held onto the final victory by four seconds. The podium was completed by  rider Tom Dumoulin, who tried to close the pair down on the mountain, but fell ten seconds shy on the stage.

With finishes of first, second and third on the sprint stages, Cavendish was a comfortable winner of the points classification. In the other classifications, Kittel's teammate Julian Alaphilippe was the winner of the young rider classification; he gained four places overall on the final day with a three-second time bonus for winning one of the intermediate sprints at the Yas Marina Circuit – moving from ninth to fifth in the process. Another final-day mover was 's Patrick Konrad, who took the intermediate sprints classification, winning the two other sprints and finishing second to Alaphilippe in the third. With eight bonus seconds, he moved from 24th to 10th overall. The teams classification was won by Costa's .

Teams
As a new event to the UCI World Tour, all UCI WorldTeams were invited to the race, but not obligated to compete in the race. As such, sixteen of the eighteen WorldTeams – all excluding  and  – competed in the race. Four UCI Professional Continental teams competed, completing the 20-team peloton.

Route
The full itinerary of the 2017 Abu Dhabi Tour was released on 24 January 2017.

Stages

Stage 1
23 February 2017 — Madinat Zayed to Madinat Zayed,

Stage 2
24 February 2017 — Al Maryah Island to Abu Dhabi,

Stage 3
25 February 2017 — Hazza Bin Zayed Stadium, Al Ain to Jebel Hafeet,

Stage 4
26 February 2017 — Yas Marina Circuit to Yas Marina Circuit,

Classification leadership table
In the 2017 Abu Dhabi Tour, four different jerseys were awarded. For the general classification, calculated by adding each cyclist's finishing times on each stage, and allowing time bonuses for the first three finishers at intermediate sprints and at the finish of mass-start stages, the leader received a red jersey. This classification was considered the most important of the 2017 Abu Dhabi Tour, and the winner of the classification was considered the winner of the race.

Additionally, there was a points classification, which awarded a green jersey. In the points classification, cyclists received points for finishing in the top 10 in a stage. For winning a stage, a rider earned 20 points, with 16 for second, 12 for third, 9 for fourth, 7 for fifth, 5 for sixth with a point fewer per place down to a single point for 10th place. Points towards the classification could also be accrued at intermediate sprint points during each stage; these intermediate sprints also offered bonus seconds towards the general classification. There was also a sprints classification for the points awarded at the aforementioned intermediate sprints, where the leadership of which was marked by a black jersey.

The fourth jersey represented the young rider classification, marked by a white jersey. This was decided in the same way as the general classification, but only riders born after 1 January 1992 were eligible to be ranked in the classification. There was also a classification for teams, in which the times of the best three cyclists per team on each stage were added together; the leading team at the end of the race was the team with the lowest total time.

References

External links

2017
2017 UCI World Tour
2017 in Emirati sport
February 2017 sports events in Asia